The 2001 Pepsi 400 was a NASCAR Winston Cup Series stock car race held on July 7, 2001, at Daytona International Speedway in Daytona Beach, Florida as the 17th of the 2001 NASCAR Winston Cup Series season. It was the first race held at Daytona since the 2001 Daytona 500, in which Dale Earnhardt was killed on the final lap. Sterling Marlin of Chip Ganassi Racing won the pole position. Dale Earnhardt Jr. of Dale Earnhardt, Inc. won the race, while DEI teammate Michael Waltrip and Elliott Sadler finished second and third, respectively.

Entry List
(R) denotes rookie driver

Qualifying
Qualifying was scheduled for Thursday, July 5, but was rained out. As a result, it was held the following day, but was delayed for 3 hours, 12 minutes due to rain. Dodge drivers claimed the first four spots, with Ward Burton, Stacy Compton and Casey Atwood. Buckshot Jones, Ron Hornaday Jr., Hut Stricklin, Mike Bliss and Andy Hillenburg failed to qualify.

Race
The Rev. Hal Marchman gave the traditional invocation, Edwin McCain sang the National Anthem, and Pop singer Britney Spears gave the command to start the engines. Ward Burton took the lead from Sterling Marlin on lap one, but relinquished it to Marlin on lap three. After Kevin Harvick, Marlin and Michael Waltrip shared the lead from laps 10 to 26, Dale Earnhardt Jr. took the lead on lap 27, leading 22 laps. Matt Kenseth and Todd Bodine would lead for a combined seven laps, before Earnhardt reclaimed the lead and led 33 more laps. The first caution of the race flew on lap 89, when Andy Houston crashed in turn 4. Robert Pressley took the lead on lap 90, which Earnhardt reclaimed the following lap. With 18 laps to go, cars entered pit road for final stops, but ten cars (Mike Skinner, Pressley, Sterling Marlin, Jeff Gordon, Kurt Busch, Terry Labonte, Bobby Hamilton, Kevin Harvick, John Andretti, Mark Martin, Dave Marcis, Jason Leffler) were involved in a crash in turn 4. Earnhardt would surrender the lead again to Johnny Benson Jr., who had made a late-race gamble to pull ahead. Dale Jr had to deal with lap traffic on the restart, but the Caution flew for the final time when Jeff Gordon's oil line cut. The race restarted with six laps to go with Johnny Benson still leading. But with five laps remaining, Earnhardt took back the lead, and with drafting assistance from Waltrip, claimed the victory. Elliott Sadler, Ward Burton and Bobby Labonte finished in the top five. Tony Stewart crossed the line in sixth, but officially classified in 26th, had his finishing spot taken by Jerry Nadeau; Rusty Wallace, Jeff Burton, Brett Bodine and Mike Wallace rounded out the top ten.

Post-race
To celebrate, Earnhardt climbed onto his car's roof, and shared an embrace with Waltrip (who had been unable to celebrate his victory in the 500 that February because of Dale Earnhardt's fatal crash) before diving into his pit crew.

After the race, Tony Stewart, who ignored orders to return to pit road due to passing Dave Blaney below the track's yellow line, knocked a tape recorder away from a Winston-Salem Journal reporter and kicked it under a hauler, and attempted to confront Cup director Gary Nelson, but was restrained by owner Joe Gibbs and crew chief Greg Zipadelli. Stewart argued that he had been forced below the yellow line by Johnny Benson, Bobby Labonte and Jeremy Mayfield. Stewart was later fined $10,000, had his probation (dating back to spinning out Jeff Gordon at Bristol Motor Speedway) extended and was penalized 65 points.

Race Results

Failed to Qualify
44 - Buckshot Jones
14 - Ron Hornaday Jr. (R)
90 - Hut Stricklin
27 - Mike Bliss
49 - Andy Hillenburg

Standings after the race

Broadcasting 
The 2001 Pepsi 400 was broadcast by NBC, as the first race broadcast by the network under a new centralized NASCAR contract which gave a consortium of NBC Sports and Turner Sports rights to broadcast the second half of the season.

25 million viewers watched the race, setting a viewership record for night races.

References

Pepsi 400
Pepsi 400
NASCAR races at Daytona International Speedway